Elections to the Supreme Soviet were held in the Soviet Union on 12 December 1937. It was the first election held under the 1936 Soviet Constitution, which had formed the Supreme Soviet of the Soviet Union to replace the old legislature, the Congress of Soviets of the Soviet Union.

Background
On 11 December, on the eve of the election, Joseph Stalin gave a speech to voters in Moscow's Bolshoi Theatre, greeted by a loud ovation lasting for several minutes with cries of "Long live great Stalin, Hurrah!" "Hurrah for Comrade Stalin, the creator of the Soviet Constitution, the most democratic in the world!" "Long live Comrade Stalin, leader of the oppressed throughout the world, Hurrah!" In his speech Stalin said that

Comrades, to tell you the truth, I had no intention of making a speech. But our respected Nikita Sergeyevich dragged me to this meeting by sheer force, so to speak...Of course, one can make a light sort of speech about everything and nothing...I have been nominated as candidate, and the Election Commission of the Stalin District of the Soviet capital has registered my candidature. This, comrades, is an expression of great confidence...For my part, I would like to assure you, comrades, that you may safely rely on Comrade Stalin...You may take it for granted that Comrade Stalin will be able to discharge his duty to the people (applause ), to the working class (applause ), to the peasantry (applause ) and to the intelligentsia. (Applause.)...The forthcoming elections are not merely elections, comrades, they are really a national holiday of our workers, our peasants and our intelligentsia. Never in the history of the world have there been such really free and really democratic elections -- never! History knows no other example like it...our universal elections will be carried out as the freest elections and the most democratic compared with elections in any other country in the world.
Universal elections exist and are also held in some capitalist countries, so-called democratic countries. But in what atmosphere are elections held there? In an atmosphere of class conflicts, in an atmosphere of class enmity...Here [in the Soviet Union] elections are held in an atmosphere of collaboration between the workers, the peasants and the intelligentsia, in an atmosphere of mutual confidence between them, in an atmosphere, I would, say, of mutual friendship...our elections are the only really free and really democratic elections in the whole world...The work is directed by men and women of the people. That is what we call Socialism in practice. In our fields the tillers of the land work without landlords and without kulaks. The work is directed by men and women of the people. That is what we call Socialism in daily life, that is what we call a free, socialist life...I would like you, comrades, to exercise systematic influence on your deputies, to impress upon them that they must constantly keep before them the great image of the great Lenin and imitate Lenin in all things."Joseph Stalin, "Speech Delivered by J.V. Stalin at a Meeting of Voters of the Stalin Electoral District, Moscow," From the Pamphlet Collection, J. Stalin, Speeches Delivered at Meetings of Voters of the Stalin Electoral District, Moscow, Foreign Languages Publishing House, Moscow, 1950, p. 7-18.

Electoral system
The elections were originally announced as being multi-candidate; however, by halfway through the year the announcement was reversed due to the leadership worrying about the possible emergence of political opposition. However, during that early period a number of individuals attempted to hold the government to the multi-candidate promise, including members of the Russian Orthodox Church who attempted to field religious candidates as a result of Article 134 of the new constitution, which promised freedom of religion. Many of the early individuals attempting to run as alternate candidates were arrested after the decision for multiple candidates was reversed. Additionally, the NKVD conducted mass arrests shortly before the elections.

Conduct
Despite the mass arrests and with the tone more subdued than with elections held in 1929, there were still minor waves of dissent and opposition to candidates, especially major political figures (including Mikhail Kalinin, Anastas Mikoyan, and even Joseph Stalin himself) as well as celebrities (such as Aleksei Tolstoy) and candidates opposed on the basis of ethnicity (such as ethnic Russians running in the Ukrainian SSR).

Results

Soviet of the Union

Soviet of Nationalities

References

External sources
"State and Society Under Stalin: Constitutions and Elections in the 1930s," article by J. Arch Getty in Slavic Review, Vol. 50, No. 1 (Spring, 1991).
The Distinctiveness of Soviet Law. Ferdinand Joseph Maria Feldbrugge, ed. Martinus Nijhoff Publishers: Dordrecht (1987): 110-112.
Fitzpatrick, Sheila. 1999. Everyday Stalinism: Ordinary Life in Extraordinary Times: Soviet Russia in the 1930s. New York: Oxford University Press, pp. 179–182.
Kalinin speech in elections to the Supreme Soviet 1937

Legislative elections in the Soviet Union
1937 elections in the Soviet Union
One-party elections
Single-candidate elections
December 1937 events
Soviet Union
Soviet Union